Hope Valley may refer to:

Australia
 Hope Valley, Western Australia, a suburb of Perth
 Hope Valley, South Australia, a suburb of Adelaide

England
 Hope Valley, Derbyshire
 Hope Valley, Shropshire, cared for by the Shropshire Wildlife Trust

North America
 Hope Valley, Alberta, a locality in the Canadian province of Alberta
 Hope Valley, Rhode Island, a village in the town of Hopkinton, in the US
 Hope Valley, Durham, North Carolina, a country club community, in the US
 Hope Valley (California), a subalpine valley in the Sierra Nevada mountains of California

See also
 Hope Vale, Queensland